Cláudio Franco de Sá Santoro (23 November 1919 – 27 March 1989) was an internationally renowned Brazilian composer, conductor and violinist.

Biography

Early life
A native of Manaus, the capital of Amazonas, Santoro started to study violin and piano as a child. His efforts made the Government of Amazonas send him to study at the Conservatório Brasileiro de Música in Rio de Janeiro.

Career
At the age of 18, he was already teaching violin at the conservatory. He was a pupil of Hans-Joachim Koellreutter, a composer who influenced him. He also studied in Paris with Nadia Boulanger. He co-founded and played in the Brazilian Symphony Orchestra. His prolific output was mostly instrumental and includes fourteen symphonies, three piano concertos and seven string quartets.

He was invited by the Government of the German Federal Republic for the Program "Resident Artist in West Berlin" (1966/67) and by the Brahms Foundation as Resident Artist of the Brahms House (Baden Baden).

Claudio Santoro died in Brasília in March 1989 at the age of 69 while conducting the rehearsal of a concert scheduled to commemorate the 14 July bicentennial of the French Revolution.

Awards
He won a 1948 prize of The Lili Boulanger Memorial Fund at the University of Massachusetts, in Boston (the judges included the composers Igor Stravinski and Aaron Copland).

Posts

Between 1970 and 1978 he was Professor of Conducting and Composition, Director of the Orchestra and the Music Department of Heidelberg-Mannheim's State Superior Music School, in Germany. Orchestras he guest-conducted include the Philharmonic of Leningrad, Moscow State Orchestra, RIAS Berlin, ORTF Paris, OSSODRE Montevideo, Beethovenhalle Bonn, Symphonic of the Radio of Prague, Philharmonic of Bucharest, Symphonic of Orchestra of Porto, Philharmonic of Sofia, PRO ART (London) Île de France (Paris), Symphonic of the Leipzig Radio, Symphonic of Magdeburg, Philharmonic of Warsaw, as well as the main Brazilian orchestras.

References

Sources

External links
Associação Cultural extensively detailed website dedicated to the life and work of Cláudio Santoro (in English)

1919 births
People from Manaus
20th-century classical composers
Brazilian composers
Brazilian film score composers
Male film score composers
1989 deaths
20th-century male musicians